Hjalmar Borgstrøm (23 March 1864 – 5 July 1925) was a Norwegian composer and music critic who played a prominent role in the musical life of his country in the first quarter of the 20th century.

Biography
He was born Hjalmar Jensen on 23 March 1864 in Kristiania (now Oslo). His father, Carl Christian Jensen, was a civil servant and the family were keen amateur musicians. Borgstrøm  showed an early aptitude for music and by the age of fifteen was a talented violinist. After studying composition and music theory in Oslo with Johan Svendsen and Ludvig Mathias Lindeman, he went to the Leipzig Conservatory in Germany for two years. On his return to Norway in 1889, he worked as a music critic for several newspapers and successfully premiered his cantata, Hvæm er du med de tusene navne (Who are you with a thousand names). However, in 1890, he left Norway and was to live for the next thirteen years in Leipzig and Berlin, where he became a friend of the Italian composer and pianist Ferruccio Busoni whose musical philosophy he shared.

Borgstrøm returned to Norway in 1903, the year in which his symphonic poem for piano and orchestra, Hamlet, premiered to great acclaim in Oslo. The soloist at the premiere was the pianist Amalie Müller. Borgstrøm and Müller married the following year and she was to become a champion of his works. The period between 1903 and Amalie's death in 1913 marked Borgstrøm's most intense period of composition. Although, he is primarily known for his symphonic works, written in a late Romantic style with influences of Expressionism, he also composed 45 songs, most notably "Svalerne" (The Swallows), "Rød valmue" (Red Poppy), and "Frossen skog" (Frozen Forest), as well as two operas, neither of which was performed in his lifetime. He also became a highly regarded music critic, writing for Verdens Gang from 1903 to 1913 and Aftenposten from 1913 to 1925.

Borgstrøm died in Oslo in on 5 July 1925 at the age of 61. His works were regularly performed until World War II, and were then largely ignored. However, the 21st century saw a resurgence of interest in him. His two operas finally received their premieres over a hundred years after they were first composed — Thora paa Rimol (Thora of Rimol) in 2002 and Der Fischer (The Fisherman) in 2003.

Principal works
String Quartet in C major, Op.6, 1887
Hvæm er du med de tusene navne (Who are you with a thousand names), cantata, 1889
Symphony in G major, Op.5, 1890
Thora paa Rimol (Thora from Rimol), opera in 2 acts, 1894
Der Fischer (The Fisherman), opera in three acts, 1900
Hamlet, symphonic poem for piano and orchestra, Op.13, 1903
Jesus i Gethsemane (Jesus in Gethsemane), symphonic poem, Op.14, 1904
John Gabriel Borkman, symphonic poem, Op.15, 1905
Die Nacht der Toten (The Night of the Dead), symphonic poem, Op.16, 1905
Sonata for Violin and Piano in G major, Op.19, 1906
Piano Concerto in C major, Op.22, 1910
Symphony in d minor, Op.24, 1912
Violin Concerto in G major, Op.25, 1914
Tanken (The Idea), symphonic poem, Op.26, 1917
Piano Quintet in F major, Op.31, 1919

Recordings
Hjalmar Borgstrøm: Thora paa Rimol – Randi Stene, mezzo-soprano, as Thora of Rimol; Harald Bjørkøy, tenor, as Olav Trygvason; Trond Halstein Moe, baritone, as Håkon Jarl; Oddbjørn Tennfjord, bass-baritone, as Tormod Kark; Trønderopera Chorus, Trondheim Symphony Orchestra; Terje Boye Hansen, conductor. Label: Simax Classics
Hjalmar Borgstrøm: Jesus i Gethsemane, Die Nacht der Toten, and Violin Concerto in G major, op.25 – Jonas Båtstrand (violin); Nils Anders Mortensen (piano); Norrlandsoperaen Symphony Orchestra; Terje Boye Hansen, conductor. Label: Simax Classics

Notes and references

Sources

Guldbrandsen, Erling E., "Hjalmar Borgstrøm", Store norske leksikon
Guldbrandsen, Erling E., "Hjalmar Borgstrøm’s studies of the soul, death, and music", Simax Classics, January 2010

External links

1864 births
1925 deaths
19th-century classical composers
20th-century classical composers
Musicians from Oslo
Norwegian classical composers
Norwegian music critics
Norwegian opera composers
Norwegian male classical composers
19th-century Norwegian composers
20th-century Norwegian male musicians
19th-century male musicians
19th-century musicians